Colorful Pop is the second studio album of the Japanese super girl group E-girls. It was released on March 19, 2014 in two different editions.

Background
E-girls announced their second album before the release of "Diamond Only". The album's covers, track list and release date were later confirmed after the group released the PV for the album's promotional single, "RYDEEN ~Dance All Night~". The album features five previously unreleased songs, including pre-released single "RYDEEN ~Dance All Night~", while the rest of the album featured songs previously released as singles or b-sides. The album also includes a Rock Version of the group's single "Follow Me" from their debut album, "Lesson 1".

Singles
Three songs from the album were released as official singles, with one promotional single:

 "Gomennasai no Kissing You" is the first single from the album and sixth overall. The song was used as the theme song for movie Shazai no Osama. It was released digitally on September 25, 2013 and physically on October 2, 2013. It features vocals from Dream's Shizuka and Ami and Flower's Reina. The music video featured all members of E-girls alongside over 500 EXPG trainees. The single sold 73,332 in its first week and is currently E-girls best selling single.
 "Kurukuru" is the second single from the album and seventh overall. It was released digitally on November 13, 2013 and physically a week later. It features vocals from Dream's Shizuka and Ami, Flower's Reina and Happiness's Karen. The single sold 69,087 in its first week.
 "Diamond Only" is the third single from the album and eighth overall. The song was used as the theme song for a Japanese drama named Koibumi Biyori. It was released digitally on September 25, 2013 and physically on October 2, 2013 in four editions: CD Only Version, CD+DVD Version, One Coin CD Version and Music Card editions for each member. It features vocals from Dream's Shizuka, Aya and Ami, Flower's Reina and Happiness's Karen. The single sold 72,808 in its first week.
 "Rydeen ~Dance All Night~" is a promotional single released prior to the album on March 5, 2014. It features vocals from Dream's Shizuka and Erie, Flower's Reina and Happiness's Karen and samples Yellow Magic Orchestra's "Rydeen".

Track listing

Personnel

Participating vocalists
"Rydeen ~Dance All Night"  – Shizuka (Dream), Erie (Dream), Karen (Happiness), Reina (Flower)
"Gomennasai no Kissing You"  – Shizuka (Dream), Ami (Dream), Reina (Flower)
"Diamond Only"  – Shizuka (Dream), Ami (Dream), Aya (Dream), Karen (Happiness), Reina (Flower)
"A S A P"  – Shizuka (Dream), Erie (Dream), Kyoka (Flower), Yuzuna (Rabbits)
"Fancy Baby"  – Ruri (Happiness), Yuzuna (Rabbits) 
"Sayonara"  – Shizuka (Dream), Reina (Flower)
"Mirai e"  – Shizuka (Dream), Ami (Dream), Reina (Flower)
"Chewing Gum"  –  Ami (Dream), Kyoka (Flower), Yuzuna (Rabbits)
"Kurukuru"  – Shizuka (Dream), Ami (Dream), Karen (Happiness), Reina (Flower)
"I Heard a Rumour ~Uwasa Wassap!~"  – Shizuka (Dream), Ami (Dream), Aya (Dream), Erie (Dream), Karen (Happiness), Ruri (Happiness), Mayu (Happiness), Reina (Flower), Kyoka (Flower), Chiharu (Flower), Yuzuna (Rabbits)
"Koi no Boogie Woogie Train"  – Shizuka (Dream), Ami (Dream), Aya (Dream), Erie (Dream), Ruri (Happiness), Mayu (Happiness), Reina (Flower), Chiharu (Flower), Yuzuna (Rabbits)
"Winter Love ~Ai no Okurimono~"  – Shizuka (Dream), Ami (Dream), Aya (Dream), Erie (Dream), Karen (Happiness), Ruri (Happiness), Mayu (Happiness), Reina (Flower), Kyoka (Flower), Chiharu (Flower), Yuzuna (Rabbits)
"Yakusoku no Basho"  – Shizuka (Dream), Ami (Dream), Aya (Dream), Erie (Dream), Karen (Happiness), Ruri (Happiness), Mayu (Happiness), Reina (Flower), Kyoka (Flower), Chiharu (Flower), Yuzuna (Rabbits)
"Follow Me"  – Ami (Dream) Karen (Happiness), Reina (Flower), Yuzuna (Rabbits)

Chart performance
The album debuted at number one on Oricon's Weekly Chart with 89,766 copies sold in the first week and has been certified Gold by the RIAJ.

Oricon

Other charts

Sales and certifications

Release history

References

2014 albums
E-girls albums
Japanese-language albums
Rhythm Zone albums